Robert W. Merry (born 1946) is an American journalist, publishing executive and commentator.

Early life
Robert W. Merry was born in 1946 in Tacoma, WA.  He served three years in the U.S. Army, including two years as a counterintelligence special agent in West Germany. He graduated from the University of Washington with a bachelor's degree in journalism in 1968 and earned a master's degree from the Columbia University Graduate School of Journalism in 1972.

Career
Merry started his career as a reporter for The Denver Post and became a Washington-based political reporter in 1974 when he joined the staff of the National Observer, a Dow Jones weekly newspaper. When the Observer folded in 1977, he became a reporter for The Wall Street Journal, and spent twelve years there covering Congress, national politics, and the White House, among other beats.

Merry became managing editor of Congressional Quarterly in 1987. He was promoted to executive editor in 1990 and became president and editor-in-chief in 1997. He held that position until The Economist purchased CQ in 2009. Merry served as editor of The National Interest from 2011 to 2013, and as editor of The American Conservative from 2016 to 2018.

Merry is the author of five books.

Works

References

External links

Living people
University of Washington College of Arts and Sciences alumni
Columbia University Graduate School of Journalism alumni
American male journalists
20th-century American journalists
21st-century American journalists
1946 births